Szałwinek  is a village in the administrative district of Gmina Kwidzyn, within Kwidzyn County, Pomeranian Voivodeship, in northern Poland.

Geography

History
For the history of the region, see History of Pomerania.

Population
The village has a population of 160.

References

Villages in Kwidzyn County